The 2023 season will be the Wigan Warriors's 43rd consecutive season playing in England's top division of rugby league. During the season, they competed in the Super League XXVIII and the 2023 Challenge Cup.

Preseason  friendlies

Super League

Fixtures
All fixtures subject to change

Table

Challenge Cup

Transfers

Gains

Losses

Squad

Notes

References

Wigan Warriors seasons
Wigan Warriors